Mitriostigma is a genus of flowering plants in the family Rubiaceae. There are five species all native to Southern Africa.

Species:
 Mitriostigma axillare Hochst.	
 Mitriostigma barteri Hook.f. ex Hiern	
 Mitriostigma greenwayi Bridson	
 Mitriostigma monocaule Sonké & Dessein	
 Mitriostigma usambarense Verdc.

References 

 
Rubiaceae genera
Taxonomy articles created by Polbot